Isben may refer to:

 Henrik Ibsen, a major 19th-century Norwegian playwright, theatre director, and poet
 Leslie Isben Rogge, an American criminal
 Sharon Isbin, an American classical guitarist